The Agen - Vic-en-Bigorre railway is a French railway line, that connected the rural areas between Agen, Auch and Tarbes.

The line is now closed between Auch and Vic-en-Bigorre and remains open to freight trains between Agen and Auch.

Services
 Up to 60 freight trains per year, carrying grain, operate along the line.

References

Railway lines in Nouvelle-Aquitaine
Railway lines in Occitania (administrative region)